Boerhavia dominii, commonly known as tarvine, is a species of flowering plant in the four o'clock family. It is native to Australia.

It is a prostrate perennial herb growing up to 1 metre in diameter. Leaves are about 40 mm long and 20 mm wide and may have a wavy edge.  It produces pale pink or pale purple flowers followed by small, hairy, furrowed fruits.

References

dominii
Flora of New South Wales
Flora of Queensland
Flora of the Northern Territory
Flora of South Australia
Flora of Victoria (Australia)
Eudicots of Western Australia